GRDC may refer to:

 Geographic Resources for Development Center, Nigeria
 Geological Research and Development Center, Indonesia
 Georgian Reconstruction and Development Company, Georgia
 Global Runoff Data Centre, Germany
 Grains Research and Development Corporation, Australia
 Guides de la République Démocratique du Congo